Tablier de sapeur (literal meaning: sapper's apron) is a Lyonnais speciality dish make from beef tripe, specifically the gras-double, which is the membrane of the rumen. It was formerly known as tablier de Gnafron (literal meaning: Gnafron's apron); Gnafron is a marionette in Lyonnais puppetry. The tripe is boiled in a court-bouillon, marinated in white wine, then covered in breadcrumbs and fried. It is usually served with a sauce gribiche with chives added and steamed potatoes. Tablier de sapeur is one of the most common dishes in the bouchons of Lyon. The Maréchal de Castellane, military governor of Lyon under Napoléon III is often said to have been responsible for the change of name.

References

French cuisine
Offal
Beef dishes
Cuisine of Lyon